Miss International 1998, the 38th Miss International pageant, took place on 26 September 1998 at the Koseinenkin Hall in Tokyo, Japan. It was won by Lía Victoria Borrero González of Panama.

Results

Placements

Special awards 
Friendship: 
, Piia Hartikainen 
, Manuella Nadou Lawson-Body
Photogenic:  Venezuela, Daniela Kosán Montcourt
National Costume: , Adriana Hurtado Novella

Contestants

  - Maria Fernanda Ortiz
  - Anushka Sheritsa Lew Jen Tai
  - Katherine Louise O'Brien
  - Liliana Peña Guachalla
  - Melanie Devina Jones
  - Adriana Hurtado Novella
  - Santa Indris Tokaay
  - Marianna Panayiotou
  - Petra Faltynova
  - Sorangel Fersobe Matos
  - Piia Hartikainen
  - Patricia Spéhar
  - Fiona Ammann
  - Eleni Pliatsika
  - Lori-Ann Lee Medeiros
  - Wendy Suyapa Rodríguez
  - Natalie Ng Man-Yan
  - Gudbjörg Sigridur Hermannsdóttir
  - Shvetha Jaishankar
  - Galia Abramov
  - Megumi Taira
  - Cho Hye-young
  - Līga Graudumniece
  - Ana Binovska
  - Karina Patricia Mora Novelo
  - Ilona Marilyn van Veldhuisen
  - Sonya Palacios Pangelinan
  - Bjorg Sofie Lovstad
  - Lía Victoria Borrero González
  - Maria Fabiola Roig Escandriolo
  - Melissa Miranda Quiñones
  - Colette Centeno Glazer
  - Agnieszka Osinska
  - Icilia Silva Berenguel
  - Maimouna Diallo
  - Sudha Menon
  - Martina Kalmanova
  - Vanessa Romero Torres
  - Manuella Nadou Lawson-Body
  - Nejla Kouniali
  - Senay Akay
  - Susan Paez
  - Daniela Kosán Montcourt

Did not compete

  - Geraldine Juliet
  - Luize Altenhofen
  - Jacqueline Negron
  - Roberta Nicholls

Notes

1998
1998 in Tokyo
1998 beauty pageants
Beauty pageants in Japan